The Rotsandnollen is a mountain of the Urner Alps, located between Melchsee-Frutt and Engelberg in Central Switzerland. The summit is located on the border between the cantons of Nidwalden and Obwalden.

References

External links
 Rotsandnollen on Hikr

Mountains of the Alps
Mountains of Switzerland
Mountains of Obwalden
Mountains of Nidwalden
Nidwalden–Obwalden border
Two-thousanders of Switzerland
Kerns, Switzerland